Kališe (in older sources also Kališče) is a settlement in the Municipality of Železniki in the Upper Carniola region of Slovenia.

Name
The name Kališe is derived from the Slovene common noun kal '(small) pond' and refers to a place with such a feature. Other Slovene toponyms with the same root include Kal, Kalce, Kališče, Kališnik, and Kalše.

History
The Slovene Home Guard had a base with three bunkers at the church above Kališe during the Second World War. On 10 March 1945 it was attacked and taken by the Slovene Partisans.

Church

The local church on the hill above the settlement is dedicated to the Holy Cross.

References

External links 

Kališe at Geopedia

Populated places in the Municipality of Železniki